Corpus Christi College Maroubra is an independent Roman Catholic comprehensive co-educational secondary day school located in Maroubra, an eastern suburb of Sydney, New South Wales, Australia.  The College was founded in 1961 by the Marist Brothers, a Catholic order of teaching brothers founded in France in the early nineteenth century by Saint Marcellin Champagnat.

The College, after being known as Marist Brothers Pagewood and later Marist College Pagewood for over 50 years, changed to Champagnat Catholic College Pagewood in 2014 as part of a range of organisational and educational changes initiated by the College.In 2023, the College renamed to Corpus Christi College as part of its transition from a single-sex (all boys) school to co-educational school.

History
The land on which the school is built was purchased during the time that Mgr. Denis Conaghan was parish priest of Maroubra, in the years 1939-1954. Father John Power was appointed parish priest of Pagewood and was instrumental in the development of the school over the next thirty years.

In 1960, building began on the John Power wing at the instigation of Mgr. Barney Hudson, the parish priest from 1954 to 1974. The architect for the project was Professor Neville Anderson of the University of New South Wales. The main two-storey block contained eight classrooms, library, manual arts room and four cloak rooms. A single-storeyed extension contained toilet facilities for the boys, accommodation for three brothers and the school canteen. This building was opened by Cardinal Norman Gilroy on 29 January 1961.

Three years later, construction of the Brother's Monastery began. The building was delayed due to a season of constant rain, but on the appointed day, 12 May, the building still in an uncompleted state was solemnly blessed and officially opened by Cardinal Gilroy. The monastery has accommodation for ten brothers and the building included a Study, Chapel and a small flat for the housekeeper.

The school was established in 1961. Originally it was formed as a primary school with 84 students and later became a high school in 1969.

Curriculum
In Years 7 and 8 students follow a general course of study that comprises Religious Education, English, Mathematics, Science, Geography, History, Japanese, Visual Arts, Music, Personal Development, Health and Physical Education, Pastoral Care, and Technology and Applied Studies.

In Years 9 and 10, the curriculum broadens as the students enter Stage 5. Students are required to study set courses in the Key Learning Areas of Religious Education, English, Mathematics, Science, History and Geography as well as Personal Development, Health and Physical Education. Students have the opportunity to select two elective courses in Year 9 and can choose again in Year 10. Additional subject choices include: Commerce, Information Software Technology, Industrial Tech (Timber or Engineering), Design and Technology, Music and Physical Activity and Sports Studies. In the compulsory Mathematics course there are three levels, which are graded according to students’ abilities.

For the senior years of Year 11 and 12 there is a wide choice of subjects offered, which includes Catholic Studies, Studies of Religion (1 or 2 unit), English (Standard, Advanced and Extension), Mathematics (all four levels are offered), Biology, Chemistry, Physics, Ancient History, Modern History, Geography, Economics, Engineering, Business Studies, Construction, Hospitality, Information Processes Technology, Information Technology VET, Industrial Tech (Timber), Computing Applications, PDHPE, Pastoral Care, Visual Arts, Visual Design and Digital Imaging, Visual Design and Work Studies.

Sport
Until 2022, the college was a member of the Metropolitan Catholic Colleges Sports Association where high level competition games, are played against Catholic high schools, within the Sydney Metropolitan area.

Notable alumni

 Ron McKeon, Olympic Games (1980 and 1984) and Commonwealth Games (1978 and 1982) swimmer  
 John Berne, former South Sydney Rugby League and Randwick, NSW and Australian Rugby Union player
 Mario Fenech, former South Sydney, NSW Rugby League player
 Matt Thistlethwaite, Incumbent MP for the Division of Kingsford Smith for the Australian Labor Party, former senator 
 Cameron McInnes, rugby league player for Cronulla Sharks
 Dean Hawkins, rugby league player who currently plays for South Sydney Rabbitohs
 Reimis Smith, rugby league player who currently plays for the Melbourne Storm
 Victor Radley, rugby league player who currently plays for the Sydney Roosters
 Peter Mamouzelos, rugby league player who currently plays for South Sydney Rabbitohs
 Riley Ayre, Cricketer for Australia & Sydney Sixers
Steve Smith, Cricketer for Australia and New South Wales

See also 

 List of Catholic schools in New South Wales
 Catholic education in Australia

References

External links
THE PAGEWOOD PROJECT
College Website
 Marist College Pagewood Annual School Report to the Community 2010
Annual School Report to the Community 2013
Marist College Pagewood - Education Directory

1961 establishments in Australia
Association of Marist Schools of Australia
Educational institutions established in 1961
Metropolitan Catholic Colleges Sports Association
Catholic secondary schools in Sydney
Maroubra, New South Wales